Mihai Doru Ștețca (born 7 March 1981) is a Romanian former footballer who played as a goalkeeper. In his career, Ștețca played for Oaşul Negrești, Gaz Metan Mediaș, Târgu Mureș, Turnu Severin and FCMU Baia Mare. After retirement, he started his goalkeeping coach career.

Honours
FCM Târgu Mureș
Liga II: 2009–2010

External links
 
 

1981 births
Living people
People from Satu Mare County
Romanian footballers
Association football goalkeepers
Liga I players
Liga II players
CS Minaur Baia Mare (football) players
CS Gaz Metan Mediaș players
ASA 2013 Târgu Mureș players
CS Turnu Severin players